Nikos Vafeas (born 21 February 1997) is a Greek professional footballer who plays as a centre-back for Super League 2 club Kifisia.

Career
On 29 June 2017, he signed a contract with Apollon Smyrnis.

On 23 January 2020, following his release from Apollon Smyrnis, he joined OFI on a two-and-a-half-year contract.

On 28 June 2021, Vafeas signed a contract with Ionikos.

Career statistics

Honours
OFI
Football League: 2017–18

References

1997 births
Living people
Greek footballers
Greece under-21 international footballers
Apollon Smyrnis F.C. players
Agrotikos Asteras F.C. players
OFI Crete F.C. players
Super League Greece players
Football League (Greece) players
Association football defenders
Footballers from Thessaloniki